Dennis Carroll (born 7 November 1960) is a former Australian rules footballer who played with the Sydney Swans in the Victorian Football League (VFL). He was the last South Melbourne player to retire for Sydney. 

From Ganmain, a small town outside Wagga Wagga, New South Wales, Carroll came from a football family. Carroll's father Laurie (St Kilda Football Club) and uncle Tom (Carlton Football Club) also played in the VFL.

Carroll was recruited by the Swans in the VFL via a zoning rule, which enabled the Swans to recruit players from New South Wales.  His first season was playing out of the Lake Oval in Melbourne in 1981, before moving with the Swans permanently to Sydney.

Carroll, a back flanker, became known as one of the finest kicks in the VFL, with the ability to dispose of the ball equally well on either foot. As an experienced campaigner and local product, Carroll was selected to captain the Sydney Swans in the Australian Football League, an honour which he held for seven seasons between 1986 and 1992, during some of the club's darkest days and the brink of extinction.  He represented both Victoria and New South Wales at State of Origin level.

Carroll retired from the AFL in 1993.  During his career he totalled 219 games for the Swans and was named on the Swans team of the century.   The award for the most improved player at the Sydney Swans, the Dennis Carroll Award is named in his honour.  The Sydney Cricket Ground has named a room the Kippax/Carroll room in honour of Dennis Carroll and cricketer Alan Kippax.

After retiring in 1993, Dennis spent four years as Sydney reserves coach and was later the Swans' match committee chairman.

References

Living people
1960 births
Australian rules footballers from New South Wales
Sydney Swans players
Albury Football Club players
New South Wales Australian rules football State of Origin players
Victorian State of Origin players